Elaine Wu may refer to:

 Wu Yili (巫漪丽), Chinese-Singaporean pianist
 Elaine Ng Yi Lei (吳綺莉), Hong Kong actress